Jang Hyeongwang (장현광; 1554 – September 15, 1637) was a Korean politician and educator, as well as a Neo-Confucian scholar of the Joseon dynasty. He was the disciple of Jeong Gu and the teacher of Heo Mok and Yun Hyu. His pen name was Yeoheon (여헌).

Books 
 Yeoheon jip (여헌집, 旅軒集)
 Yeokhakdoseol (역학도설, 易學圖說)
 Seongniseol (성리설, 性理說)
 Yongsa ilgi (용사일기, 龍蛇日記)

See also 
 Yi Hwang
 Jo Sik
 Jeong gu
 Yi I
 Seong Hon
 Yi Eonjeok
 Heo Mok
 Yun Seondo
 Yun Hyu
 Yi Seowoo

External links 

 Jang Hyeongwang:NAver 
 여헌 장현광 
 Jang Hyeongwang:Korean Histirical people's information 
 Jang Hyeongwang:Nate 

1554 births
1637 deaths
16th-century Korean poets
17th-century Korean poets
Korean politicians
Korean scholars
Korean Confucianists
16th-century Korean philosophers
Neo-Confucian scholars
Korean male poets
Indong Jang clan